7th Gaumee Film Awards ceremony, honored the best Maldivian films released between 2011 and 2013. The ceremony was held on 21 December 2016.

Winners and nominees

Main awards
Nominees were announced on 16 December 2016.

Technical awards

Most wins
Loodhifa - 10
Fathis Handhuvaruge Feshun 3D - 3

See also
 Gaumee Film Awards

References

Gaumee Film Awards
2016 film awards
2016 in the Maldives
December 2016 events in Asia